Franco Ressel (8 February 1925 – 30 April 1985) was an Italian film actor. He appeared in more than 120 films between 1961 and 1985. He was born in Naples, Italy and died in Rome, Italy.

Selected filmography

 La cento chilometri (1959) - The Gay Race Walker (uncredited)
 The Assassin (1961) - Dottore Francesconi
 Rome 1585 (1961) - Grillo
 Maciste alla corte del Gran Khan (1961) - Captain of the Khan's Guards
 The Wonders of Aladdin (1961) - Vizier's Lieutenant
 Erik the Conqueror (1961) - King Lotar
 Caccia all'uomo (1961) - Capo Cameriere (uncredited)
 His Women (1961) - René
 Marco Polo (1962)
 Damon and Pythias (1962)
 Lo smemorato di Collegno (1962) - Agente Pubblicitario
 The Four Monks (1962) - Il Barone Cimino
 The Girl Who Knew Too Much (1963) - Arresting Officer at Airport (uncredited)
 The Monk of Monza (1963) - Ufficiale del balzello
 Toto and Cleopatra (1963) - (uncredited)
 Scandali nudi (1963) - Regista Pagiolini
 The Four Musketeers (1963) - Lord Buckingham
 Revenge of the Musketeers (1963)
 Toto vs. the Black Pirate (1964) - Lo sfregiato
 Blood and Black Lace (1964) - Marquis Richard Morell
 What Ever Happened to Baby Toto? (1964) - Ufficiale americano (uncredited)
 La sfinge sorride prima di morire - stop - Londra (1964)
 In ginocchio da te (1964) - Gian Maria
 Challenge of the Gladiator (1965)
 Hercules the Avenger (1965) - Eteocles
 Agent 077: From the Orient with Fury (1965) - Goldwyn
 Operation Atlantis (1965) - Fritz
 War Italian Style (1965) - Col. Jaeger
 In a Colt's Shadow (1965) - Jackson
 James Tont operazione U.N.O. (1965)
 The Upper Hand (1966)
 James Tont operazione D.U.E. (1966) - Jack Clifford - the spaceman
 Password: Kill Agent Gordon (1966) - Albert Kowalski / Ms. Kastiadis
 Wild, Wild Planet (1966) - Lt. Jeffries
 War of the Planets (1966) - Freddie (uncredited)
 War Between the Planets (1966) - Capt. Charles Danton
 Taste for Killing (1966) - Aarons
 Rififi in Amsterdam (1966) - Max Fischer
 Rojo (1966) - Wallace
 Blueprint for a Massacre (1967)
 La morte viene dal pianeta Aytin (1967)
 El hombre del puño de oro (1967) - Krasna
 Assault on the State Treasure (1967) - Elias
 Tom Dollar (1967) - mr. Gaber
 Crónica de nueve meses (1967) - Juan
 Man, Pride and Vengeance (1967) - Lieutenant Pepe / Commander
 Delitto a Posillipo - Londra chiama Napoli (1967) - Peter Harriman
 Days of Fire (1968) - Passenger
 All on the Red (1968) - Reikovic
 The Last Chance (1968) - Commissioner
 Persecución hasta Valencia (1968)
 Trusting Is Good... Shooting Is Better (1968) - Mr. Hartman
 The Son of Black Eagle (1968) - General Volkonsky
 The Magnificent Tony Carrera (1968)
 The Mercenary (1968) - Studs
 Lucrezia (1968) - Ambasciatore d'Aragona
 L'amore è come il sole (1969)
 Zorro in the Court of England (1969) - Lord Percy Moore
 Il ragazzo che sorride (1969) - Mine owner
 Un corpo caldo per l'inferno (1969) - Mr. Wilkins
 Nel labirinto del sesso (Psichidion) (1969) - Fetishist
 Tarzana, the Wild Girl (1969) - Groder
 Sabata (1969) - Stengel
 Madame Bovary (1969) - Adolphe Lheureus
 Rangers: attacco ora X (1970) - Captain Köhler
 Formula 1: Nell'Inferno del Grand Prix (1970) - Frank Donovan
 Sartana in the Valley of Death (1970) - Norton
 Mr. Superinvisible (1970)
 Have a Good Funeral, My Friend... Sartana Will Pay (1970) - Samuel Piggot
 La califfa (1970) - Un industriale
 Stanza 17-17 palazzo delle tasse, ufficio imposte (1971) - Gay at Railway Station (uncredited)
 Trafic (1971)
 The Deadly Trap (1971)
 Oasis of Fear (1971) - Man That Buys Aural Porn (uncredited)
 Cross Current (1971) - Tommy Brown
 They Call Him Cemetery (1971) - Judge
 Trinity Is Still My Name (1971) - Maitre D'
 Il sergente Klems (1971) - Lieutenant Dupleix
 The Devil with Seven Faces (1971) - Inspector Rinker
 Le belve (1971) - Attorney (segment "Processo a porte chiuse")
 The Valachi Papers (1972) - (uncredited)
 Eye in the Labyrinth (1972) - Eugene
 Naked Girl Killed in the Park (1972) - Bruno - the butler (uncredited)
 Two Sons of Trinity (1972) - Alex Armstrong, '4 assi'
 A.A.A. Massaggiatrice bella presenza offresi... (1972) - D'Angelo
 Where the Bullets Fly (1972)
 Treasure Island (1972) - Sgt. Dance (uncredited)
 Seven Deaths in the Cat's Eye (1973) - Priest
 La vedova inconsolabile ringrazia quanti la consolarono (1973) - l'avvocato di Caterina
 La ragazza fuoristrada (1973) - Piero Badani
 Mr. Hercules Against Karate (1973) - Assistant to Site Administrator
 Bad Kids of the West (1973) - Wilson
 Long Lasting Days (1973) - The Doctor
 The Sinful Nuns of Saint Valentine (1974) - Don Alonso - Lucita's father
 Silence the Witness (1974) - L'ingegner Aldo Marchetti
 L'eredità dello zio buonanima (1974) - L'architetto
 Manone il ladrone (1974) - Avvocato
 Cagliostro (1975) - Morandi, News editor
 Il pavone nero (1975) - Kluger / engineer
 Calling All Police Cars (1975) - Gynaecologist
 La polizia interviene: ordine di uccidere! (1975) - Lombardi's Lawyer
 L'arbre de Guernica (1975) - Onesimo
 Povero Cristo (1976) - Pregiudicato
 Nick the Sting (1976) - Jeweller Parker
 Per amore (1976) - The Doctor in Geneva
 Paura in città (1976)  - Lo Cascio
 La malavita attacca... la polizia risponde! (1976) - Franco
 California (1977) - Full
 Bobby Deerfield (1977) - Man With Dog
 Nazis dans le rétro (1977) - Général Keitel
 Un amore così fragile, così violento (1978) - Maresciallo
 Fearless (1978) - Dr. Zimmer
 The Perfect Crime (1978) - Sgt. Phillips
 Scherzi da prete (1978) - Il direttore del giornale
 L'inquilina del piano di sopra (1978)
 Star Odyssey (1979) - Cmdr. Barr
 Inchon (1981) - Officer Aboard Mt. McKinley (uncredited)
 Panic (1982) - Mr. Milton
 Il conte Tacchia (1982)
 And the Ship Sails On (1983) - Il medico (uncredited)
 Petomaniac (1983) - Guglielmo II°
 A tu per tu (1984) - Notary

References

External links

1925 births
1985 deaths
Male actors from Naples
Italian male film actors
20th-century Italian male actors